Thomas Biggs ( 1542–1613) was an English MP for Evesham between 1604 and 1611.

Thomas Biggs may also refer to:
Sir Thomas Biggs, 1st Baronet (c. 1577–1621), English politician
Thomas Biggs of Biggs Island
Tom Biggs (born 1984), rugby union footballer

See also
Biggs (surname)